Igor Turchin may refer to:

 Igor Turchin (fencer) (born 1982), Russian fencer
 Igor Turchin (handball) (1936–1993), Soviet and Ukrainian handball coach